Online complex processing (OLCP) is a class of realtime data processing involving complex queries, lengthy queries and/or simultaneous reads and writes to the same records.

Sources
http://www.pcmag.com/encyclopedia_term/0,2542,t=online+complex+processing&i=48345,00.asp

See also
Online transaction processing 
OLAP
Transaction processing

Data management
Databases